1940 Academy Awards may refer to:

 12th Academy Awards, the Academy Awards ceremony that took place in 1940
 13th Academy Awards, the 1941 ceremony honoring the best in film for 1940